Central Transdanubia is a statistical (NUTS 2) region of Hungary. The capital is Székesfehérvár. It is part of Transdanubia (NUTS 1) region. Central Transdanubia includes counties of Fejér, Komárom-Esztergom, and Veszprém.

See also
List of regions of Hungary

References 

 
NUTS 2 statistical regions of the European Union